Steve Ball (born 22 November 1973) is an English former footballer who made 42 appearances in the Football League playing as a midfielder for Darlington. He began his career as a trainee with Leeds United, played briefly in Ireland for Cork City, and went on to play non-league football for clubs including Farsley Celtic, Emley, Bradford Park Avenue, Harrogate Town, and Guiseley.

References

1973 births
Living people
Footballers from Leeds
English footballers
Association football midfielders
Leeds United F.C. players
Darlington F.C. players
Cork City F.C. players
Farsley Celtic A.F.C. players
Wakefield F.C. players
Bradford (Park Avenue) A.F.C. players
Harrogate Town A.F.C. players
Guiseley A.F.C. players
English Football League players
Northern Premier League players